Ibănești is a commune in Mureș County, Transylvania, Romania. It is composed of ten villages: Blidireasa (Blidirászaházcsoport), Brădețelu (Disznópatak), Dulcea (Dulcsa), Ibănești, Ibănești-Pădure (Erdőlibánfalva), Lăpușna (Laposnyatelep), Pârâu Mare (Sziródrész), Tireu (Tyiró), Tisieu (Tyiszó) and Zimți (Zimc).

At the 2002 census, 99.6% of inhabitants were Romanians and 0.3% Hungarians. 90.3% were Romanian Orthodox, 5.8% Greek-Catholic, 2.3% Seventh-day Adventist, 0.7% Pentecostal and 0.4% Baptist.

See also
List of Hungarian exonyms (Mureș County)

References

Communes in Mureș County
Localities in Transylvania